Mount Dickey is a peak on the west side of the Ruth Gorge in the Central Alaska Range of mountains, 12 miles (19 km) southeast of Denali and 4 miles (6 km) southwest of The Moose's Tooth. Despite its relatively low elevation, it is notable for its east face, which has around a vertical mile (1600 m) of sheer granite—it achieves this vertical gain in less than half a mile (800m) horizontal distance. This is one of the tallest rock walls in the world, and the face has seen many world-class climbs.

Mount Dickey was first climbed on April 19, 1955 by David Fisher and the famous explorer, climber and cartographer Bradford Washburn, via the West Face, which is still the most popular route today. The route begins at a point in the Ruth Gorge southeast of the peak, ascends west under the formidable south face, then turns north and then east to ascend the south side of the gently sloping West Face. This route is relatively straightforward and short for an Alaskan climb (Alaska Grade 1). It is also the most common descent route for those who have climbed the extremely technical routes on the East Face.

Roger Cowles and Brian Okonek made the first winter ascent of Mount Dickey in February 1979.

The first route on the east side of the mountain was climbed in July 1974, by author-mountaineer David Roberts, photographer-mountaineer Galen Rowell, and Ed Ward. Their 5,100 foot (1,554 m) route climbed a pillar on the southeast face; most of their ascent was accomplished over four days. Perhaps the most famous other route on the mountain is the "Wine Bottle Route" on the right side of the east face, climbed in 1988 by Thomas Bonapace and Andreas Orgler. This is an exceptionally technical and long route, 5250 feet (1600 m) high. Other similarly challenging routes have been climbed on the mountain since.

Climate
Based on the Köppen climate classification, Mt. Dickey is located in a subarctic climate zone with long, cold, snowy winters, and mild summers. Temperatures can drop below −20 °C with wind chill factors below −30 °C. The months May through June offer the most favorable weather for climbing or viewing.

Gallery

See also

List of mountain peaks of Alaska
Geology of Alaska

Sources
American Alpine Journal, 1975, 1980, 1989, 2003.

References

External links
 Mount Dickey on Topozone
 Mount Dickey weather: Mountain Forecast
 Flying through 747 Pass around Mount Dickey: YouTube 

Mountains of Matanuska-Susitna Borough, Alaska
Dickey, Mount
Denali National Park and Preserve
Dickey